John Henry Young (1934 – 9 April 2022), known professionally as Jeremy Young, was an English actor of Scottish descent.

Young had numerous television credits, including Deadline Midnight (1960), Doctor Who (appearing as caveman Kal in three episodes of the first serial An Unearthly Child in 1963, as well as playing Gordon Lowery in the one episode serial Mission to the Unknown in 1965), The Avengers in 1966 (notably as Willy Frant in the episode "A Touch of Brimstone" though also in the episodes entitled "Never, Never Say Die" (1967), "The Forget-Me-Knot" (1968) and (in The New Avengers) "Gnaws" in 1976), and Coronation Street as nightclub owner Benny Lewis in 1972. His film credits include appearances in The Wild and the Willing (1962), Crooks and Coronets (1969), Eyewitness (1970), Hopscotch (1980) and Photographing Fairies (1997).

He worked for BBC Radio and taught and directed at the Court Theatre Training Company which is part of the Courtyard, London.

Young was married to actress Coral Atkins in 1960, and later to Kate O'Mara from 1971 to 1976. He died on 9 April 2022.

Filmography

Film

Television

References

External links
 

1934 births
2022 deaths
English male television actors
English people of Scottish descent
Male actors from Liverpool